Jacques de Chambly (died 1687) was from a French military background and became a seigneur in the New World and a governor of Acadia.

Chambly arrived in New France in 1665 when he was a captain in the Carignan-Salières Regiment. He immediately was in charge of the construction of Fort Saint-Louis (now known as Fort Chambly) on the Richelieu Rapids. He then took part in the Prouville de Tracy’s expedition against the Iroquois. When his regiment was disbanded he returned to France but returned to service in Canada in 1670.

In 1672 he received a seigneury on the Richelieu River in present-day Quebec, Canada. In 1673 he was appointed governor of Acadia, replacing Hector d'Andigné de Grandfontaine at the capital of Acadia, Fort Pentagouet.

References

External links 
 
 Official Parks Canada Website - Fort Chambly National Historic Site of Canada

Year of birth missing
1687 deaths
Governors of Acadia
French Governors of Martinique